Pearl Nkrumah, (born c. 1980), is a Ghanaian businesswoman,
lawyer, banker and corporate executive, who is the executive director at Access Bank Ghana Plc, a commercial bank, effective February 2022. She is the first woman to serve in that position, since the commercial bank was founded in 2009.

Background and education
Nkrumah was born in Ghana in the 1980s. She attended local primary and secondary schools, before being admitted to the University of Ghana, the country's largest and oldest public university. She graduated with a Bachelor of Science degree in Business Administration. Her second degree, a Master of Business Administration, was obtained from the same university. She also holds a Bachelor of Laws degree, awarded by the Ghana Institute of Management and Public Administration.

Career
She started her banking career circa 2004, as a bank teller at Standard Chartered Ghana. Over the years, she was given more responsibilities, rising through the ranks to assistant branch manager and then to business relationship manager. In 2012, after nearly 9 years at Standard Chartered Ghana, she left and was hired by Stanbic Bank Ghana.

At Stanbic Bank Ghana, Nkrumah continued to rise  in rank, from relationship manager in commercial banking to head of new business, to head of SME banking. At the time she left Stanbic, she was the head of main markets, responsible for retail banking, analytics, banking platforms, partnerships and innovation. She is credited for establishing the Youth Banking Desk at Stanbic Bank Ghana, "an innovation to increase youth financial inclusion".

Other considerations
In her position as executive director at Access Bank Ghana, Pearl Nkrumah sits on the board of directors and is a member of the executive management team of that commercial bank.

See also
 Access Bank Group
 List of banks in Ghana

References

External links
 Website of Access Bank Ghana Plc.

1980s births
Living people
Ghanaian bankers
21st-century Ghanaian businesswomen
21st-century Ghanaian businesspeople
Ghanaian business executives
University of Ghana alumni
Ghana Institute of Management and Public Administration alumni
Ghanaian women business executives